Instituto Comercial Alberto Valenzuela Llanos is a Chilean high school located in San Fernando, Colchagua Province, Chile.

History
The high school was founded on January 30, 1964.

References 

Secondary schools in Chile
Schools in Colchagua Province
1964 establishments in Chile
Educational institutions established in 1964